The Woman of the Port (Spanish: La mujer del puerto) is a 1949 Mexican drama film directed by Emilio Gómez Muriel and starring María Antonieta Pons, Víctor Junco and Arturo Soto Rangel. It is a remake of the 1934 film of the same title.

The film's sets were designed by the art director Jesús Bracho.

Main cast
 María Antonieta Pons as Rosario / Carolina Méndez 
 Víctor Junco as Alberto Méndez 
 Arturo Soto Rangel as Don Antonio Méndez 
 Eduardo Egea as Julián 
 Pascual García Peña as Don Fernando 
 Arturo Martínez as Marcelo 
 Eduardo Noriega as Carlos
 Lupe Carriles as Vecina
 Irma Dorantes as Chica en carnaval

References

Bibliography 
 Emilio García Riera. Historia documental del cine mexicano: 1949-1950. Universidad de Guadalajara, 1992.

External links 
 

1949 films
1949 drama films
Mexican drama films
1940s Spanish-language films
Films directed by Emilio Gómez Muriel
Remakes of Mexican films
Mexican black-and-white films
1940s Mexican films